Sweet Right Here is the fourth studio album by American country music trio SHeDAISY.  It was released on June 8, 2004. It peaked at 16 on the Billboard 200 chart and at number 2 on the Country Albums Chart on June 26, 2004. This album has received Gold certification by the RIAA for shipment of over 500,000 copies.

The singles from this album, "Passenger Seat", "Come Home Soon", and "Don't Worry 'bout a Thing", reached numbers 12, 14, and 7, respectively, on the Billboard Hot Country Songs charts. Pop girl group Girl Authority covered "Don't Worry 'bout a Thing" for their debut 2006 album.

Track listing

Personnel

SHeDAISY
Kassidy Osborn — high harmony vocals
Kelsi Osborn — lead vocals
Kristyn Osborn — low harmony vocals

Musicians
 Tim Akers — keyboards on "Come Home Soon"
 Eric Darken — percussion
 Dan Dugmore — steel guitar
 Shannon Forrest — drums
 Jim Hoke — harmonica on "Don't Worry 'bout a Thing", Jew's harp
 Dann Huff — acoustic guitar, electric guitar
 Charlie Judge — keyboards on "He's a Hero"
 Gordon Kennedy — acoustic guitar, electric guitar
 Jerry McPherson — acoustic guitar, electric guitar
 Jimmy Nichols — piano on "Without a Sound"
 Jimmie Lee Sloas — bass guitar on "360° of You", "Borrowed Home", "Good Together", "He's a Hero", "Love Goes On", and "A Woman's Work"
 Glenn Worf — bass guitar on "5 4 3 2 Run", "I Dare You", "Come Home Soon", "Don't Worry 'bout a Thing", and "Passenger Seat"
 Jonathan Yudkin — fiddle, mandolin, violin, cello, banjo, harmonica on "360° of You"

Technical
 Jeff Balding — recording, mixing
 Brady Barnett — recording
 Mark Hagen — recording
 Dann Huff — producer
 Justin Niebank — mixing on "Passenger Seat"

Charts

Weekly charts

Year-end charts

References

2004 albums
SHeDAISY albums
Lyric Street Records albums
Albums produced by Dann Huff